Edward Anthony Wolfe (January 2, 1929 – March 8, 2009) was a professional baseball pitcher. He appeared in three games as a relief pitcher in Major League Baseball for the Pittsburgh Pirates during the 1952 season. Listed at 6' 3", 185 lb., he batted and threw right-handed.

A native of Los Angeles, California, Wolfe posted a 7.36 ERA and did not have a decision or save, giving up three runs on seven hits and five walks while striking out one in 3.2 innings of work.
 
Wolfe died in Modesto, California, at the age of 80.

External links

Baseball Almanac
Retrosheet

Major League Baseball pitchers
Pittsburgh Pirates players
Modesto Reds players
Bartlesville Pirates players
Charleston Rebels players
New Orleans Pelicans (baseball) players
Hollywood Stars players
Fullerton Hornets baseball players
Baseball players from Los Angeles
1929 births
2009 deaths